The following is a list of masters of Corpus Christi College, Cambridge:

References
Master – Corpus Christi College, Cambridge

Corpus Christi College, Cambridge
Corpus Christi